The Benson Dillon Billinghurst House, at 729 Evans Ave. in Reno, Nevada, was built in 1910.  It was a home of educator Benson Dillon Billinghurst, who was superintendent of schools of Washoe County during a long period, from 1908 until his death in 1935.  He led innovations such as the introduction of junior high schools.  That Nevada's schools were rated second in quality, nationwide, by a 1933 U.S. Department of Education study, was regarded as testament to Billinghurst's leadership statewide.  It was listed on the National Register of Historic Places in 1974.

The house is a two-story bungalow-style house, with an interior having varnished, stained pine finishes.  The house is significant for its association with educator Billinghurst.

References 

Houses in Reno, Nevada
Houses completed in 1910
Houses on the National Register of Historic Places in Nevada
National Register of Historic Places in Reno, Nevada